Bernard A. Bradley (September 9, 1909 – July 24, 1986) was an American football and basketball coach. He served as the head football coach at Loyola Marymount University in 1942.

Early life
Bradley attended La Salle University in Philadelphia, Pennsylvania, where he played on the football team as a guard under Marty Brill from 1933 to 1934. In 1934, he served as team captain on La Salle's undefeated squad. Bradley graduated from La Salle in 1935.

Coaching career
After college, Bradley served as the head coach at La Salle High School in Philadelphia through 1937. In 1939, he served as an assistant coach at his alma mater, and in April of the following year, he was hired by his former college coach at Loyola Marymount. He worked as the line coach and scout for two seasons. In August 1942, Bradley was promoted to replace Brill as the head coach at Loyola. He led Loyola to a 5–4–1 record.

In March 1943, Bradley resigned his post at Loyola to return as head coach at La Salle High School. In 1949, he joined the coaching staff at Villanova as a line coach. In 1950, he worked as the freshman coach and as a scout for the varsity team.

In his later life, he lived in the Holmesburg neighborhood of Northeast Philadelphia. Bradley died at the Nazareth Hospital on July 24, 1986 at the age of 76.

Head coaching record

College football

College basketball

References

1909 births
1986 deaths
American football guards
Basketball coaches from Pennsylvania
La Salle Explorers football players
La Salle Explorers football coaches
La Salle University alumni
Loyola Lions football coaches
Loyola Marymount Lions men's basketball coaches
High school football coaches in Pennsylvania
Players of American football from Philadelphia
Villanova Wildcats football coaches
Sportspeople from Philadelphia